Li Jianshu (born 1959), also known as Jian-Shu Li, is a Chinese mathematician working in representation theory and automorphic forms. He is the founding director of the Institute for Advanced Study in Mathematics at Zhejiang University and Professor Emeritus at the Hong Kong University of Science and Technology.

Early life and education

Li was born in Xiaoshan, Zhejiang, China. He graduated from Xiaoshan Middle School. Li studied mathematics at the Department of Mathematics at Zhejiang University. He obtained his Ph.D. in mathematics from Yale University under the supervision of Roger Evans Howe in 1987.

Career
Li was a Moore Instructor at the Massachusetts Institute of Technology and a professor at the University of Maryland, College Park. Li is Professor Emeritus at the Hong Kong University of Science and Technology, and has previously served as President of the Hong Kong Mathematical Society and as Chang Jiang Chair Professor of Zhejiang University.

Li is the founding director of the Institute for Advanced Study in Mathematics at Zhejiang University

Awards and honors 
Li was a recipient of a Sloan Research Fellowship in 1992  
and an invited speaker at the International Congress of Mathematicians (ICM) in 1994 (Section: Lie Groups). 
He has been a member of the Chinese Academy of Sciences (CAS) since 2013.

Selected works 
 
 
 
 "On the classification of irreducible low rank unitary representations of classical groups", Compositio Math. 71 (1989), no. 1, 29–48.

References

External links
 Hong Kong Mathematical Society
 LI Jian-Shu's homepage at Zhejiang University
 LI Jian-Shu's homepage at the Hong Kong University of Science and Technology
 Institute for Advanced Study in Mathematics at Zhejiang University

1959 births
Living people
21st-century Chinese mathematicians
20th-century Chinese mathematicians
Educators from Hangzhou
Academic staff of the Hong Kong University of Science and Technology
Massachusetts Institute of Technology School of Science faculty
Mathematicians from Zhejiang
Members of the Chinese Academy of Sciences
Scientists from Hangzhou
University of Maryland, College Park faculty
Yale University alumni
Zhejiang University alumni
Academic staff of Zhejiang University